Cuxham with Easington is a civil parish in South Oxfordshire. It includes the villages of Cuxham and Easington. The 2011 Census recorded a parish population of 149, unchanged from the census ten years' prior, and its area is 3.18 km², the third smallest in the district of those shown in the 2011 census.

References

Civil parishes in Oxfordshire
South Oxfordshire District